Anchor is the second studio album by Canadian country music duo Autumn Hill, released on June 16, 2015 via Wax Records and distributed by Universal Music Canada. Its lead single, "Blame", became their first song to reach the top five on the Billboard Canada Country chart.

Background
Their debut studio album, Favourite Mistake, was released in 2013 and produced four country airplay hits. With "Anything at All" charting at both the adult contemporary and country formats, the duo earned the distinction of being the first Canadian country music act to crossover to pop radio since Shania Twain. Produced by Dave Thomson, Anchor was co-written by Autumn Hill and songwriters from Nashville, Tennessee. After touring with Kira Isabella in late 2014, the duo sought to move away from the ballad-heavy approach of their previous record and "focus on songs that would translate to our live shows," according to member Mike Robins.

Promotion
"Blame" was released on March 3, 2015 as the album's lead single. The music video premiered the same date. It failed to enter the Billboard Canadian Hot 100, but reached a peak position of 4 on the Canada Country airplay chart, marking the duo's first top five hit.

"Return Policy" was released to Canadian country radio on August 31, 2015 as the second official single.

The album's third single, "Mixtape", was serviced to radio on January 27, 2016.

The album's fourth single, "Good Night for Going Nowhere" released to Canadian country radio on May 18, 2016.

Other songs
During the lead-up to the album's release, three tracks were released to iTunes as promotional singles supporting pre-orders: "It Don't Get Better Than This" premiered June 3, 2015; "Summertime Free" premiered June 5, 2015; and "Return Policy" premiered June 8, 2015.

Track listing

Credits and personnel
Credits adapted from liner notes.

Recorded and engineered at
 Buffalo, New York 
 Nashville, Tennessee 
 Toronto, Ontario 

Performance credits
 All vocals – Autumn Hill (Tareya Green, Mike Robins)
 Background vocals – Doug DeLuca, Nathan Meckel, Lindsay Rimes, Ethan Roberts, David Thomson

Instruments

 Banjo – Lindsay Rimes, Derek Wells
 Bass – Luis Espaillat, Mike Rinney, David Thomson, Nolan Verner
 Bouzouki – David Thomson
 Cello – David Thomson
 Drums – Matt King
 Fiddle – Zach Renquist

 Guitars  – Tim Galloway, Rob McNelley, Blue Miller, Justin Ostrander, Lindsay Rimes, Mike Robins, David Thomson, Derek Wells
 Keyboards and piano – Jamie Appleby, Nathan Meckel, David Thomson, Chris Tuttle
 Lap steel and slide guitars – David Thomson, Derek Wells
 Mandolin – Tim Galloway, Lindsay Rimes
 Percussion – Matt King

Production

 Art director – Tareya Green
 Engineers – Brad Hill, Brad Lauchert, Nathan Meckel, Mark Niemiec Lindsay Rimes, David Thomson
 Assistant engineers – Tom Freitag
 Management – Alex Seif Union Entertainment Group
 Mastering – Phil Demetro
 Mixers – Jeff Dalziel, Billy Decker, David Thomson, Miles Walker
 Assistant mixer – Ryan Jumper

 Packaging designer – Tareya Green
 Photographer – Matt Barnes
 Record producer – Tareya Green, Nathan Meckel, Lindsay Rimes, David Thomson
 Programming – Nathan Meckel, Lindsay Rimes, David Thomson
 Songwriters – Phil Barton, Kris Bergsnes, Stephanie Chapman, Todd Clark, Tareya Green, John King, Jason Massey, Nathan Meckel, Blue Miller, Christian Rada, Lindsay Rimes, Mike Robins, Matt Rogers, Gavin Slate, David Thomson

Chart performance

Singles

References

2015 albums
Autumn Hill albums